Mario dos Santos Júnior or simply Junior (born 27 October 1971) is a former Brazilian football player. He and Luís André da Silva were the first Brazilian players in the Russian Football Premier League when they joined FC Lokomotiv Nizhny Novgorod in 1995.

References

1971 births
Living people
Brazilian footballers
FC Lokomotiv Nizhny Novgorod players
Brazilian expatriate footballers
Expatriate footballers in Russia
Russian Premier League players

Association football forwards